Vizeadmiral Hubert von Rebeur-Paschwitz (14 August 1863 Frankfurt (Oder) – 16 February 1933 (Dresden)) was a German admiral. In 1899 he served as the German Naval attaché to Washington and later in 1912 commanded a flotilla of German vessels that visited the United States. During World War I he was transferred to the Black Sea in order to command the Central Powers naval forces that had previously been under the command of Admiral Souchon who had been recalled to the High Seas Fleet in 1917. Rebeur-Paschwitz decided to launch an offensive into the Mediterranean Sea which ended in his defeat at the Battle of Imbros.

Decorations and awards
 Order of the Red Eagle, 2nd class with oak leaves (Prussia)
 Order of the Crown, 2nd class (Prussia)
 Knight's Cross of the Royal House Order of Hohenzollern
 Honorary Knights of Order of Saint John (Bailiwick of Brandenburg)
 Service Award (Prussia)
 Commander Second Class of the Order of the Zähringer Lion (Baden)
 Commander 2nd class of the Order of Philip the Magnanimous (Grand Duchy of Hesse)
 Honour Commander of the House and Merit Order of Peter Frederick Louis (Oldenburg)
 Commander Second Class of the Albert Order
 Knight's Cross, First Class of the House Order of the White Falcon
 Cross of Honour of the Order of the Crown (Württemberg)
 Commander, First Class of the Order of the Dannebrog (Denmark)
 Commander of the Order of the Redeemer (Greece)
 Honorary Commander of the Royal Victorian Order (United Kingdom)
 Grand Officer of the Order of the Crown of Italy
 Grand Officer of the Order of Orange-Nassau (Netherlands)
 Commander Class II of the Order of St. Olav (Norway)
 Commander with Star of the Order of Franz Joseph (Austria)
 Order of St. Stanislaus, 2nd class with Star
 Commander, First Class of the Order of the Sword (Sweden)
 Iron Cross of 1914, 1st and 2nd class

References

1863 births
1933 deaths
People from Frankfurt (Oder)
Vice admirals of the Imperial German Navy
Imperial German Navy admirals of World War I
Ottoman Empire admirals
Fleet Commanders of the Ottoman Navy
German untitled nobility
Commanders First Class of the Order of the Dannebrog
Honorary Commanders of the Royal Victorian Order
Grand Officers of the Order of Orange-Nassau
Recipients of the Order of Franz Joseph
Commanders First Class of the Order of the Sword
Admirals of the Reichsmarine
Military personnel from Brandenburg